The 10th Parliament of Sri Lanka was a meeting of the Parliament of Sri Lanka, with the membership determined by the results of the 1994 parliamentary election held on 16 August 1994. The parliament met for the first time on 25 August 1994 and was dissolved on 18 August 2000.

Election

The 10th parliamentary election was held on 16 August 1994. The People's Alliance (PA), an alliance of opposition parties, became the largest group in Parliament by winning 105 of the 225 seats. The incumbent United National Party (UNP) won 94 seats. The Eelam People's Democratic Party (EPDP), a government backed Tamil paramilitary group, won 9 seats and the Sri Lanka Muslim Congress (SLMC) won 7 seats. Smaller parties won the remaining 10 seats.

Results

The new parliament was sworn in on 25 August 1994. K. B. Ratnayake was elected Speaker, Anil Moonesinghe was elected Deputy Speaker and Rauff Hakeem was elected Deputy Chairman of Committees.

Government

The PA was able to form a government with the support of the seven SLMC MPs and one independent MP.

On 19 August 1994 President D. B. Wijetunga appointed Chandrika Kumaratunga, leader of the PA, as Prime Minister. The rest of the government were sworn in on the same day.

Prime Minister Kumaratunga was elected president at the 3rd presidential election held on 9 November 1994. On 14 November 1994 she appointed her mother Sirimavo Bandaranaike as Prime Minister. Prime Minister Bandaranaike retired on 10 August 2000 and was replaced by Ratnasiri Wickremanayake.

President Kumaratunga dissolved parliament on 18 August 2000.

Changes in party/alliance affiliations
The 10th parliament saw the following defections:

Deaths and resignations
The 10th parliament saw the following deaths and resignations:
1994: J. P. V. Vipulaguna (SLPF-HAM) resigned. He was replaced by Nihal Galappaththi (SLPF-HAM).
24 October 1994: Gamini Dissanayake (UNP-KAN), Weerasinghe Mallimarachchi (UNP-COL) and Ossie Abeygunasekara (UNP-COL) assassinated . Their replacements were P. P. Devaraj (UNP-COL) and Ramaiah Yogarajan (UNP-COL).
12 November 1994: Chandrika Kumaratunga (PA-GAM) resigned to take up presidency.
11 February 1997: Nalanda Ellawala (PA-RAT) murdered.
5 July 1997: A. Thangathurai (TULF-TRI) murdered.
20 July 1997: Mohamed Maharoof (UNP-TRI) murdered.
30 December 1997: Bernard Soysa (PA-COL) died. His replacement was Dixon J. Perera (PA-COL).
15 July 1998: Sarawanabavanandan "Vasanthan" Shanmuganathan (DPLF-VAN) murdered.
29 July 1999: Neelan Tiruchelvam (TULF-NAT) murdered. His replacement was Mavai Senathirajah (TULF-NAT).
3 September 1999: A. C. S. Hameed (UNP-KAN) died.
30 October 1999: Savumiamoorthy Thondaman (PA-NAT) died.
2 November 1999: Nadarajah "Ramesh" Atputharajah (EPDP-JAF) murdered.
7 June 2000: C. V. Gunaratne (PA-COL) murdered.

Members

References
 

Parliament of Sri Lanka
1994 Sri Lankan parliamentary election